Taogong Palace is a Taoist temple located on the west side of Linxiang Hill, beside the Liuyang River, in Langli Subdistrict, Changsha County, Hunan, China.

History
In honor of Tao Kan, Taogong Palace was first built by his grandson Tao Dan in 504, in the 3rd Year of Period Tianjian (502–519) in Liang dynasty (502–587).

The temple was badly damaged during the Cultural Revolution and almost all of plaques which written by historical famous people were either removed, vandalized or destroyed. In 1988, the temple was restored by the municipal government. Then an extensive renovations began in 1994. It has been designated as a "provincial level key cultural heritage" in 1996.

The eldest things in the temple is a 1000-year-old camphor tree.

Architecture
The temple includes the following halls: Shanmen, Operatower, Stone steps, Main Hall and Side Palace Hall.

Main Hall
The Main Hall are generally two-room buildings (the front hall and the back hall) at the central axis of temples in the highest point of the temple. Tan Kan and Guan Yin are enshrined in the front hall and the back hall respectively. Its surface paved by granite stones. A plaque which was written by Zhu Xi on the Main Hall. It reads "" in Chinese.

Transportation
 Take bus No. 169 to Shaoguang Community Bus Stop
 Take bus Xingsha 103 to Xingsha No. 2 Hospital Bus Stop

References

Buildings and structures in Changsha
Taoist temples in Hunan
Tourist attractions in Changsha
6th-century establishments in China
6th-century religious buildings and structures